Mikalai Aliokhin (born 9 April 1998) is a Belarusian handball player for HC Meshkov Brest and the Belarusian national team.

He participated at the 2018 European Men's Handball Championship.

References

1998 births
Living people
Belarusian male handball players
Sportspeople from Vitebsk Region